Flávio Teixeira (born 14 January 1951), known as Flávio Murtosa or simply Murtosa, is a Brazilian former professional footballer and currently professional football manager. Murtosa has a long friendship with FIFA World Cup winning manager Luiz Felipe Scolari and works mostly as his assistant coach.

Career
Murtosa began playing professional football as a right winger with his hometown's Esporte Clube Pelotas in 1967. He played in the Campeonato Gaúcho with Pelotas, before signing with Maranhão Atlético Clube in 1975. After one season, he returned to Pelotas where he would play until a knee injury forced him to retire at age 26.

Honours

Club

Al Qadisiya
Kuwait Emir Cup: 1989

Criciúma
Copa do Brasil: 1991

Grêmio
Campeonato Brasileiro Série A: 1996
Copa do Brasil: 1994
Campeonato Gaúcho: 1987, 1995, 1996
Copa Libertadores de América: 1995
Recopa Sudamericana: 1996

Palmeiras
Copa do Brasil: 1998, 2012
Copa Mercosur: 1998
Copa Libertadores: 1999
Torneio Rio-São Paulo: 2000
Copa dos Campeões: 2000

Cruzeiro
Copa Sul-Minas: 2001

Bunyodkor
Uzbek League: 2009

International

Kuwait
Gulf Cup of Nations: 1990

Brazil
FIFA World Cup: 2002
FIFA Confederations Cup: 2013

References

1951 births
Living people
Brazilian footballers
Brazilian football managers
Esporte Clube Pelotas players
Maranhão Atlético Clube players
Al-Ahli Saudi FC managers
Esporte Clube Juventude managers
Sociedade Esportiva Palmeiras managers
People from Pelotas
Association football midfielders
Guangzhou F.C. non-playing staff
Chelsea F.C. non-playing staff
Sportspeople from Rio Grande do Sul